Mounds Mall is a defunct enclosed shopping mall located in the city of Anderson, Indiana, United States. Opened in stages between 1964 and 1965, it was the first enclosed mall developed by Melvin Simon & Associates, now known as Simon Property Group. The mall's original anchor stores were H. P. Wasson and Company, Montgomery Ward, and J. C. Penney; over time, the Wasson store became Meis, Elder-Beerman, and Carson's, while Montgomery Ward became Sears and J. C. Penney was torn down and rebuilt as a movie theater. After a period of decline,  Mounds Mall closed to the public in April 2018. The movie theater closed a year later, leaving no businesses in the building.

History
Mounds Mall was developed by Melvin Simon & Associates (now Simon Property Group), opening in 1965 as the company's first mall and the second mall in Indiana (Evansville's fully enclosed Washington Square began business in October 1963). 

The mall officially opened in April 1965, although anchor stores Montgomery Ward and H. P. Wasson and Company had opened the previous November. Original tenants included Zales, Kroger, Woolworth, and Jo-Ann Fabrics.

Montgomery Ward closed and became Sears in 1983. Also in the 1980s, the Wasson’s store closed. Meis opened a store around a year later, Meis was rebranded into Elder-Beerman in 1983, and finally Carson's in 2011. In 2012, the Sears closed as a result of low sales of the 2011 holiday season. On January 31, 2018, The Bon-Ton announced that Carson's would be closing as part of a plan to close 42 stores nationwide. The store closed on April 29th, 2018. Shortly later, it was announced that the whole mall would close along with the Carson's. The mall closed on April 1, 2018.

References

 Anderson: A Pictorial History by Esther Dittlinger
 Indianapolis: Hoosiers' Circle City by George W. Geib, copyright 1981. page 208

External links
Official website

Shopping malls in Indiana
Buildings and structures in Anderson, Indiana
Shopping malls established in 1965
Shopping malls disestablished in 2018
Tourist attractions in Anderson, Indiana
2018 disestablishments in Indiana
Abandoned shopping malls in the United States
Unused buildings in Indiana
1965 establishments in Indiana